Luminous is the fourth studio album by English rock band the Horrors. It was released on 5 May 2014 by record label XL. The album's style has been described as neo-psychedelia, shoegazing and dream pop. In 2014 it was awarded a silver certification from the Independent Music Companies Association, which indicated sales of at least 20,000 copies throughout Europe.

Critical reception

At Alternative Press, Annie Zaleski rated the album 4 stars, remarking how "Luminous certainly wears its influences proudly; however, the record boasts undeniable energy and urgency". Pitchfork's Ian Cohen said, "They have[…]mastered their sound and vision, and hopefully they can grow to recognize their heart and soul, too", while Heather Phares of AllMusic stated that "Luminous proves the Horrors still have a sense of adventure; they sound comfortable, but not too comfortable to try new things". Consequence of Sound reviewer Kristofer Lenz also praised the album, saying, "Across the board, Luminous represents a solid step forward for the Horrors. With this newly expanded sound and epic scope, they’ve moved beyond their early garage rock and goth influences and are now in conversation with Brit rockers like Muse or Radiohead. While they are still a long way from taking the crown from either of those two, Luminous is a shot across the bow, letting the world know the punks have grown up".

Track listing
All songs written and arranged by the Horrors except where noted.

Personnel

 The Horrors – production, arrangements, art direction, design
 Marc Donaldson, Nic Shonfeld – art direction, design
 Eduardo de la Paz Canal – recording
 Craig Silvey – co-production, recording, mixing
 Greg Calbi, Ryan Smith – mastering
 Nic Shonfeld – photography 
 Cathy Lucas – violin (tracks 5, 6 and 7) 
 Frank Ricotti – marimba, vibraphone (track 6)

References

External links 

 

2014 albums
The Horrors albums
XL Recordings albums
Experimental pop albums